Pigsy Eats Watermelon is a 1958 Chinese animation short film produced at the Shanghai Animation Film Studio by Wan Laiming and Wan Guchan.  It is also translated as "Mr. Pig Eats Watermelon" or "Zhu Bajie Eats Watermelon".  Wan Guchan innovated a new paper-cut technique and this film was the first to utilize the method.

Story
The main character was Zhu Bajie, the Chinese folklore character from the literature Journey to the West.  Though the story was considered more of a spin-off.  The character was used, since pigs were often associated with greed in the culture.

Creators

References
 CCTV cartoon history

External links
 China's Movie Database

1958 animated films
1958 films
Chinese animated films
1950s stop-motion animated films
1958 short films
1950s Mandarin-language films
Chinese animated short films
Fictional pigs